Siegfried II (c. 956 – 1037), Count of Stade, was the youngest son of Henry I the Bald, Count of Stade, and his wife Judith von der Wetterau, granddaughter of Gebhard, Duke of Lorraine. He succeeded his brother, Henry as Count of Slade in 1016.

Siegfried married Adela of Rhienfelden, daughter of Gero, Count of Alsleben, and his wife Adela. Siegfried and Adelaide had three children:
 Lothair Udo II, Count of Stade, and Margrave of Nordmark (as Lothair Udo I)
 Irmgard von Stade, Abbess of Alsleben
 Bertha von Stade, Abbess of Alsleben.

Siegfried was succeeded as Count of Stade by his son Lothair Udo II.

References

Sources 

 Warner, David A., Ottonian Germany: The Chronicon of Thietmar of Merseburg, Manchester University Press, Manchester, 2001
 Bury, J. B. (editor), The Cambridge Medieval History: Volume III, Germany and the Western Empire, Cambridge University Press, 1922
 Hucke, Richard G., Die Grafen von Stade 900-1144. Genealogie, politische Stellung, Comitat und Allodialbesitz der sächsischen Udonen; Diss. Kiel, Stade mit umfassenden Nachweisen der Quellen und älteren Literatur, 1956
 Medieval Lands Project, Grafen von Stade (family of Lothar)

950s births
1037 deaths
Counts of Stade
10th-century Saxon people
10th-century rulers in Europe
11th-century Saxon people
11th-century rulers in Europe
People captured by pirates